Hotan County (also known as Gosthana, Gaustana, Godana, Godaniya, Khotan, Hetian, Hotien) is a county in the southwest of the Xinjiang Uyghur Autonomous Region and is under the administration of the Hotan Prefecture. Almost all the residents of the county are Uyghurs and live around oases situated between the desolate Taklamakan Desert and Kunlun Mountains. Hotan County is the southernmost county-level division of Xinjiang. The county borders Karakax/Moyu County to the northwest, Hotan City and Lop County to the northeast, Qira County to the east, Pishan County to the west, and (in Aksai Chin) Rutog County, Tibet to the southeast. Hotan County administers most of Aksai Chin, an area disputed between China and India. The Line of Actual Control divides the India-controlled part of Ladakh union territory from the Aksai Chin area administered as part of southwest Hotan County.

Name
The area of Hotan is originally known as and has been historically referred to as Godana (Godaniya), a Sanskrit name meaning "Land of the cows". In Chinese, the same name is written as Yu-t'ien, pronounced as Gu-dana. It is referred to as Gosthana by local Tibetans, which also means the same in Sanskrit.

History

On January 18, 1913, Hotan became a county.

In 1919, Karakax/Moyu County was split off from Hotan County.

In 1933, Muhammad Amin Bughra and his associates declared the Khotan Emirate.

On December 22, 1949, the People's Liberation Army entered Hotan.

In 1959, the Chinese character name for the county was set as ''.

In 1962, some of the events of the Sino-Indian War occurred in the disputed Aksai Chin region.

On April 12, 1969 during the Cultural Revolution, the Hotan County People's Government became the Hotan County Revolutionary Committee. In December 1979, the Hotan County Revolutionary Committee was disestablished and the Hotan County People's Government re-established.

In 1983/4, the urban area of Hotan was administratively split from the larger Hotan County, and from then on governed as a county-level city.

On September 9, 1995, Vice Premier Zhu Rongji visited Buzhake Township.

On July 11, 2006, the township of Tusalla (Tushala), then part of Hotan County, was transferred to Hotan City.

In 2012, Hanerik (Han'airike) was changed from a township into a town and Uzunsho (Wuzongxiao) township was established.

On July 28, 2013, an incident involving Muslim protesters and local police in Hanerik (Han'airike/Hanairke) occurred. Chinese state media said no one died during the confrontation. There were reports of protester deaths, as many as over 100.

Geography
The northernmost point of the county is in the Taklamakan Desert at the confluence of the White Jade River and Karakash River, which together create the Hotan River.

Major lakes administered as part of Hotan County include the soda lakes Aksai Chin Lake and Surigh Yilganing Kol (Surigh-yilganing Köl), both part of the disputed Aksai Chin. A Chinese military outpost called Tianshuihai which is named for another lake, Tianshuihai, is also in the Hotan County administered part of the disputed Aksai Chin region. The Hotan County-administered part of Aksai Chin includes Tianwendian, site of a Chinese military post.

Climate 

Hotan County has a cool arid climate (Köppen climate classification BWk).

Administrative divisions
Hotan County includes two towns, ten townships, and one other area:

Towns:

Townships:
 Yengiawat (Ying'awati;  / ), Yengierik (Ying'airike;  / ), Bozak (Buzhake, Buzak, Buzaq;  / ), Layka (Layika, Layqa;  / ), Langru ( / ), Tewekkul (Tawakule;  / ), Islamawat (Yisilamu'awati;  / ), Seghizkol (Segezi Kule;  / ), Qashteshi (Kashitashi;  / ), Uzunsho (Wuzongxiao;  / )

Other:
 Hotan County Economic New Area

Economy
The county is known for Hotan Silk, Hotan Jade and Hotan Carpets. The county's agricultural products include wheat, rice, corn, melons, cotton, and silkworm cocoons.

Demographics

In 1997, the population of Hotan County was 99% Uyghur.

As of 2015, 325,117 of the 327,533 residents of the county were Uyghur, 2,023 were Han Chinese and 393 were from other ethnic groups.

In 2019, the population of Hotan County was 99% Uyghur.

As of 1999, 99.41% of the population of Hotan (Hetian) County was Uyghur and 0.46% of the population was Han Chinese.

Transportation
 China National Highway 315
 China National Highway 219, which passes through the disputed Aksai Chin region

Notes

References

County-level divisions of Xinjiang
Hotan Prefecture
Territorial disputes of China
Territorial disputes of India